Yarudagh is a mountain peak of the Greater Caucasus range, located in the Qusar District of Azerbaijan.

References

External links

Four-thousanders of the Caucasus
Mountains of Azerbaijan